London Street Commune was a hippy movement formed during the 1960s. It aimed to highlight concerns about rising levels of homelessness and to house the hundreds of hippies sleeping in parks and derelict buildings in central London. 

The commune famously squatted a mansion at 144 Piccadilly on Hyde Park Corner, which became a media sensation. The group was quickly evicted in a high-profile Metropolitan Police operation and other squatting attempts were also rebuffed.
One of the leaders of the commune who often spoke to the media was known as 'Dr. John.' He was actually Phil Cohen, who later became an urban ethnographer and emeritus professor at the University of East London.

Hippydilly

Occupation
Around 200 hippy squatters occupied 144 Piccadilly in September 1969. The building was a mansion built by Sir Drummond Smith in the late 1790s, which had been lived in by Lord Palmerston when he became prime minister in 1855. It was surrounded by a dry moat so they built a makeshift drawbridge to control the entrance. The place quickly became known as Hippydilly.

Intensive media coverage made the occupation a sensation and the numbers of people on the street outside never dropped below 500. Up until the eviction, most police activity was dedicated to controlling the violent right-wing elements in the crowd who wanted to attack the squat. In one incident, five motorbikes were set on fire. An eighteen year old squatter welcomed in the press and made £300 in five days giving supposedly exclusive interviews to the mainstream newspapers about fictional orgies and drugs binges.

Despite its short lifespan, the squat attracted many visitors. The Commune had planned to occupy the building peacefully and argue their need for housing in court, but the attacks from police and skinheads meant that things began to go out of control. The Commune invited Hells Angels to act as security and they began to take over the building.

Eviction
After six days, the eviction came swiftly on 21 September 1969. Commanding police officer Chief Inspector Michael Rowling told the occupants that a woman was giving birth and needed assistance, so they lowered the drawbridge and then 200 police swarmed in. The operation took just three minutes to clear the building.

Almost 100 people were arrested during the eviction, most were immediately released again the same day.

Aftermath
The next day, mainstream the press reported as follows: Daily Mirror - Fall of Hippy Castle; The Times - Squatters ousted by police commando; Daily Telegraph - Police rout Piccadilly Hippies. 

The police had performed an illegal eviction since they had no possession order.

Property developer Ronald Lyon was so impressed with the police action that he went to West End Central police station and donated £1000.

The building stood empty for three years and then was demolished despite its listed status. It is now the site of the InterContinental London Park Lane hotel.

Other actions
After Hippydilly, the London Street Commune moved to a previously squatted school at Endell Street in Covent Garden. This was evicted after a few days in another large police operation. There were 63 arrests and one month later 32 people were still being held at Ashford Remand Centre. Of these, eight were singled out as ringleaders and charged under the Forcible Entry Act 1429. After a trial at Lewes Crown Court, all eight were found guilty, but the punishments varied. Two people were jailed for nine months, two sent to detention centres, three were given suspended sentences and one was fined £20.

An office building in Russell Square in Bloomsbury was then occupied and quickly evicted.

References

External links
 Memories of 144 Piccadilly and the London Street Commune
 First hand account of the Dilly dossers and the London Street Commune by Supercrew
 International Times article, 15 August 1969 - beginnings of the LSC & picture of the 'Dilly' in 69
 'An open letter to the Underground from the London Street Commune' and articles by Dave Williams and Ron Bailey - IT66, 10 October 1969 

1960 in London
1960s in London
Homelessness in England
Housing organisations based in London
Political campaigns in the United Kingdom
Squats in the United Kingdom
Squatters' movements
Former squats